The New Zealand Surf Life Saving team, also known as the Black Fins, is the mixed national team of New Zealand, and a member of the International Life Saving Federation. They were the 2012 World Life Saving Champions. "Black Fins" is one of many national team nicknames related to the All Blacks.

Below is the 2012 World Championships team:

Head coach: Scott Bartlett
Assistant coach: Jason Pocock
Team Manager: Mark Weatherall
Physio: Susan Perret

External links
Surflifesaving.org.nz
Surflifesaving.org.nz
Official website

Lifesaving in New Zealand
Surf Life Saving
Surfing in New Zealand